"Dick Around" is a song by the American rock band Sparks. It was the second single from Hello Young Lovers, the twentieth album by the group. The song was edited from 6 minutes and 35 seconds to 3 minutes 51 seconds for the single and video. It is the opening track on the album Hello Young Lovers. An EP was also released in the US and was also widely available in the UK. The UK single version was released as a double A-side with "Waterproof".

Track listings
EP
 "Dick Around"
 "(Baby Baby) Can I Invade Your Country (Alternate Lyrics)"
 "Happy Hunting Ground (Live)"
 "Bon Voyage (Live)"
 "In the Future (Live)"
 "Interview of Sparks by Steve Jones of Jonesey's Jukebox"
 "Dick Around" (CD-ROM Track)
 "Perfume" (CD-ROM Track)

7"
 "Dick Around"
 "Hospitality On Parade (Live)"

UK single
 "Dick Around"
 "Waterproof"
 "Change (Live)"
 "Interview"
 "Dick Around" (CD-ROM Track)

Personnel
 Ron Mael - keyboards, orchestrations and production
 Russell Mael - vocals, engineering and production
 John Thomas - mixing and additional engineering
 Tammy Glover - drums
 Dean Menta - guitars

Chart positions

References

External links

2006 singles
Sparks (band) songs
2006 songs
Songs written by Ron Mael
Songs written by Russell Mael